Hadlow Rural Community School is a coeducational secondary school located in Hadlow in the English county of Kent.

It is a free school that was established in 2013 by Hadlow College. The school is located on the grounds of the college, and is the first secondary school in Kent to offer a farm-based education for pupils.

Hadlow Rural Community School offers GCSEs as programmes of study for pupils. In addition the school offers land-based courses in conjunction with Hadlow College.

References

External links
Hadlow Rural Community School official website

Secondary schools in Kent
Free schools in England
Educational institutions established in 2013
2013 establishments in England
Hadlow